Mary Longman (born 1964 in Fort Qu'Appelle, Saskatchewan) is a Canadian artist. She is of Saulteaux heritage from the Gordon First Nation. Her Aboriginal name is Aski-Piyesiwiskwew. She is known for her sculptures, drawings, and paintings, which examine political, cultural, spiritual and environmental issues related to the experiences of Aboriginal people and colonialism, including the Sixties Scoop and residential schools.

Career 
Longman is an Associate Professor in Art and Art History at the University of Saskatchewan specializing in Aboriginal Art History and sculpture and drawing.  Her art has been exhibited in Canadian galleries including the National Gallery of Canada, Museum of Civilization, Vancouver Art Gallery, MacKenzie Art Gallery, Mendel Art Gallery, and McCord Museum. International venues include the Museum of Modern Art, the Smithsonian, and the Hood Museum.

She has stated that she aims to "depict the psychological and social effects these [colonial] views have upon people of First Nations, minority groups and the general public.  My Aboriginal ancestry allows me to closely and critically analyze Eurocentric views within my everyday life experiences and to more clearly understand other Aboriginal voices of the past and present. The ultimate goal is to disseminate an awareness of these conditioning effects and hopefully bring about a greatly needed change of thought."

Longman's sculpture Ancestors Rising was  commissioned  by the MacKenzie Art Gallery in Regina, Saskatchewan and marks the Saskatchewan centennial as well as a First Nations presence in Regina’s sculptural landscape. On National Aboriginal Day, June 21, 2006, this  sculpture  was unveiled in front of the MacKenzie Art Gallery in Wascana Park.

Her family experiences have influenced her work. Longman’s mother was born in 1949 and was put in residential school as a child. The digital art work titled Warrior Woman: Stop the Silence!! was created in response to her mother's experiences.

Longman was a recipient of the Distinguished Alumni award from the Emily Carr Institute of Art and Design (2000), Lieutenant Governor Award finalist in the Saskatchewan Artist Award category (2012) and the Provost Teaching Excellence Award in Aboriginal Education (2015).

Exhibitions
Selected Solo Exhibitions
 2016 - Sâkêwêwak Artists' Collective, Regina, Saskatchewan, Warrior women & selected works
 2004 - Makenzie Art Gallery, Regina, Saskatchewan, Mary Longman
 2000 - Thunder Bay Art Gallery, Thunder Bay, Ontario, Blood and Stones
 1999 - Dunlop Art Gallery, Regina, Saskatchewan, Saskdiaspora
 Waneuskwewin Gallery, Saskatoon, Saskatchewan, Blood and Stones
 1996 - Kamloops Art Gallery, Kamloops, British Columbia, Traces
 1995 - Neutral Ground, Regina, Saskatchewan, Coming Home
 1988 - Emily Carr Institute of Art and Design, Vancouver, British Columbia, Wolves in Sheep's Clothing

References

Sources 
 Dales, Jennifer. (2010-01-10). "Landmarks of time and place: The art of Mary Longman" Rabble.ca. Retrieved 2016-02-28.
 "Mary Longman" University of Saskatchewan College of Arts & Sciences. Retrieved 2016-02-28.
 "Mary Longman" Aboriginal Curatorial Collective (ACC). Retrieved 2016-02-28.
 "Dr. Mary Longman MFA ‘93" NSCAD University Alumni & Friends. Retrieved 2016-02-28.
 Mary Longman: Transposing Perspectives Mendel Art Gallery, 2011 

21st-century Canadian women artists
21st-century Canadian artists
Artists from Saskatchewan
Living people
Emily Carr University of Art and Design alumni
NSCAD University alumni
University of Victoria alumni
Academic staff of the University of Saskatchewan
1964 births
George Gordon First Nation